Athletics competitions at the 1997 Central American Games were held at the Estadio Olímpico Metropolitano in San Pedro Sula, Honduras, between December 12-15, 1997.  

A total of 46 events were contested, 24 by men and 22 by women.

Medal summary

Gold medal winners were published.  A couple of medals and results could be retrieved from the archive of Costa Rican newspaper La Nación, and from Nicaraguan newspaper La Prensa.    A complete list of medal winners can be found on the MásGoles webpage
(click on "JUEGOS CENTROAMERICANOS" in the low right corner).  Gold medalists were also published in other sources.

Men

Women

Medal table (unofficial)

References

Athletics at the Central American Games
International athletics competitions hosted by Honduras
Central American Games
1997 in Honduran sport